Solute carrier family 35, member F1 is a protein that in humans is encoded by the SLC35F1 gene. The gene is also known as C6orf169 or dJ230I3.1.

Model organisms
				
Model organisms have been used in the study of SLC35F1 function. A conditional knockout mouse line, called Slc35f1tm1a(KOMP)Wtsi was generated as part of the International Knockout Mouse Consortium program — a high-throughput mutagenesis project to generate and distribute animal models of disease to interested scientists — at the Wellcome Trust Sanger Institute.

Male and female animals underwent a standardized phenotypic screen to determine the effects of deletion. Twenty five tests were carried out on mutant mice but no significant abnormalities were observed.

References

Further reading 
 

Human proteins
Genes mutated in mice